Shamkan (also Romanized as Shāmkān; also known as Shāhmakān) is a village in Shamkan Rural District, Sheshtomad District, Sabzevar County, Razavi Khorasan Province, Iran. At the 2006 census, its population was 2,102, in 541 families.

References 

Populated places in Sabzevar County